Borys Mykolayovych Hudyma  (born 29 December 1941, in Primorsky Krai) is a Ukrainian diplomat and politician, who has served as Ukraine's ambassador to the European Union and as Permanent Representative of Ukraine to the United Nations.

Early life and education 
Borys Hudyma graduated from the Taras Shevchenko National University of Kyiv, Faculty of Philology (1969); Faculty of Law (1982);
Rate improving diplomatic representatives at the Diplomatic Academy of the Foreign Ministry of the USSR (1983).
He speaks foreign languages: English, Russian and Spanish.

Professional career and experience 
From 1969 to 1971 - he was a translator of English group of Soviet specialists in Damascus Syria.

From 1971 to 1974 - he taught at the Department of Theory and Practice of Translation Faculty of Philology of the Taras Shevchenko National University of Kyiv.

From 1974 - was a senior laboratory and Translation Institute of State and Law of Ukraine.

From 1974 to 1975 - he worked Attaché Consular Department of the MFA of the Ukrainian SSR.

From 1975 to 1980 - he was an employee of the International Labour Organization in Geneva.

From 1980 to 1982 - he was as 2nd Foreign Ministry Secretary Ukrainian SSR.

From 1982 to 1983 - he participated in the courses of improvement governing diplomatic staff at the Diplomatic Academy of the USSR Ministry of Foreign Affairs.

From 1983 to 1984 - he was as 2nd Secretary Ministry of Foreign Affairs of Ukraine.

From 1984 to 1989 - he was as 2nd, 1st Secretary of the Permanent Mission of the Ukrainian Soviet Socialist Republic to the United Nations in New York City.

From 1989 to 1993 - he was as 1st Secretary, Counselor, Department of International Economic Organizations, Counsellor, Head of International Organizations. Member of the delegation of the Ukrainian SSR at 46th session of the UN General Assembly.

From 12.1992 to 1994 - he was head of International Organizations, Ministry of Foreign Affairs Ukraine member of the board.

From 1994 to 1996 - he was the Deputy Permanent Representative of Ukraine to the United Nations.

From 03.1996 to 01.1998 - he was the Deputy Minister of Foreign Affairs of Ukraine. Chairman of the Intergovernmental Commission on Cooperation Ukraine within the Central European Initiative. Member of the commission for drafting bilateral agreements with Ukraine Bulgaria, the Czech Republic and the Federal Republic of Germany on Yamburgskoye agreements. Member of the Advisory Board of independent experts with comprehensive solutions to problems related linked to the Chernobyl nuclear power plant Member State Interdepartmental Commission for perpetuating the memory of the victims of war and political repression.

From 04.1996 to 11.1997 - Member Committee President of Ukraine on citizenship..

From 12.1997 to 07.2000 - member of the commission on nuclear policy and environmental security of the President of Ukraine.

On 10.12.1997 on 21.03.2000 - he was a representative of Ukraine to the European Union.

On 21.03.2000 on 19.04.2004 - he Extraordinary and Plenipotentiary of Ukraine to the Republic of Italy. Signed on behalf of Ukraine Convention on international interests in mobile equipment and the Protocol to the convention on international interests in mobile equipment on matters relating to aircraft equipment, adopted on 16 November 2001 in the Cape Town.

From 21.03.2000 to 19.04.2004 - he was the Ambassador of Ukraine to the Republic of Malta concurrently. Signed Agreement between the Government of Ukraine and the Republic of Malta on cooperation in combating illicit trafficking in narcotic drugs, psychotropic substances and precursors and organized crime.

From 21.03.2000 to 19.04.2004 - he was the Ambassador of Ukraine to the Republic of San Marino in combination.

From 19.01.2004 to 04.2004 - he Permanent Representative of Ukraine to the Food and Agriculture Organization (FAO) of the UN in combination.

From 26.08.2004 to 09.06.2006 - he was Ambassador to the Kingdom of Morocco.

From 26.08.2004 to 26.12.2006 - he was Ambassador to Mauritania in combination.

Diplomatic rank 
 Ambassador Extraordinary and Plenipotentiary of Ukraine.

References

External links 
 Permanent Mission of Ukraine to the United Nations
 Mission of Ukraine to the European Union
 BORYS HUDYMA RELIEVED OF POSITION OF EXTRAORDINARY AND PLENIPOTENTIARY AMBASSADOR TO ITALY AND OF COMBINING SEVERAL POSITIONS
 PRESIDENT DE MARCO RECEIVES LETTERS OF CREDENCE OF THE AMBASSADOR OF UKRAINE AND THE AMBASSADOR OF THE HELLENIC REPUBLIC
 Permanent Mission of Ukraine to the United Nations
 Observing 10 Years of Independence at the Permanent Mission of Ukraine to the United Nations
 Borys Hudyma relieved of position of Extraordinary and Plenipotentiary Ambassador to Italy and of combining several positions
 PRESIDENT LEONID KUCHMA SIGNS DECREE TO APPOINT BIRYS HUDYMA UKRAINIAN PERMANENT REPRESENTATIVE TO UN FOOD AND AGRICULTURAL ORGANIZATION

1941 births
Living people
Taras Shevchenko National University of Kyiv alumni
Permanent Representatives of Ukraine to the United Nations
Ambassadors of Ukraine to Italy
Ambassadors of Ukraine to the European Union
Ambassadors of Ukraine to Morocco